Antonio Freitas, Jr. (May 5, 1908 – March 14, 1994) was an American baseball player who played as a pitcher in the minor leagues and Major League Baseball, spending most of his career with the Sacramento Senators of the Pacific Coast League. He played in the majors with the Philadelphia Athletics (1932–1933) and the Cincinnati Reds (1934–1936). He batted right-handed and threw left-handed.

Born in Mill Valley, California, Freitas attended Tamalpais High School in the mid-1920s. He was recruited by the Senators, playing with two of their Arizona farm clubs in 1928 and 1929. He moved up to the PCL with the Senators during the 1929 season. He won 19 games in both the 1930 and 1931 seasons.

After pitching a no-hitter on his birthday in 1932, Frietas moved up to the Philadelphia Athletics for two seasons, followed by three with the Cincinnati Reds. He went back down to the minors during the 1936 season, returning to the Sacramento team (by then named the Solons) in 1937.

Freitas served in the U.S. Army Air Corps during World War II from 1943 to 1945. He returned to the PCL with the Solons after the war, playing there into the 1950 season. He completed his 25-year playing career with four seasons in the California League, playing for the Modesto Reds in 1950 and 1951 and for the Stockton Ports in 1952 and 1953. He was the manager of the Solons in the 1954 and 1955 seasons.

With 342 wins in the minors, Freitas is fourth all-time and is the winningest left-handed pitcher. He won 20 or more games nine times. He has been selected for the Pacific Coast League's Hall of Fame and for its All-Century Team.

Freitas died in Orangevale, California, at the age of 85.

References

External links

 Sacramento Solons History

1908 births
1994 deaths
Major League Baseball pitchers
Philadelphia Athletics players
Cincinnati Reds players
Baseball players from California
United States Army Air Forces personnel of World War II
People from Mill Valley, California
Sacramento Solons managers
Tamalpais High School alumni